Grumello Cremonese ed Uniti is a comune (municipality) in the Province of Cremona in the Italian region Lombardy, located about  southeast of Milan and about  northwest of Cremona.  
Grumello Cremonese ed Uniti borders the following municipalities: Acquanegra Cremonese, Annicco, Cappella Cantone, Crotta d'Adda, Pizzighettone, Sesto ed Uniti.

References

Cities and towns in Lombardy